This article presents the complete discography of Los Hermanos.

Studio albums

Singles

References

Hermanos, Los
Alternative rock discographies